Audio most commonly refers to sound, as it is transmitted in signal form. It may also refer to:

Sound
Audio signal, an electrical representation of sound
Audio frequency, a frequency in the audio spectrum
Digital audio, representation of sound in a form processed and/or stored by computers or digital electronics
Audio, audible content (media) in audio production and publishing
Semantic audio, extraction of symbols or meaning from audio
Stereophonic audio, method of sound reproduction that creates an illusion of multi-directional audible perspective
Audio equipment

Entertainment
AUDIO (group), an American R&B band of 5 brothers formerly known as TNT Boyz and as B5
Audio (album), an album by the Blue Man Group
Audio (magazine), a magazine published from 1947 to 2000
Audio (musician), British drum and bass artist
"Audio" (song), a song by LSD

Computing
, an HTML element, see HTML5 audio

See also
Acoustic (disambiguation)
Audible (disambiguation)
Audiobook
Radio broadcasting
Sound recording and reproduction
Sound reinforcement